Beaver Flat is a resort village in the Canadian province of Saskatchewan within Census Division No. 7. It is on the shores of South Saskatchewan River in the Rural Municipality of Excelsior No. 166.

History 
Beaver Flat incorporated as a resort village on April 1, 1981.

Demographics 

Government 
The Resort Village of Beaver Flat is governed by an elected municipal council and an appointed administrator. The mayor is Bill Bresett and its administrator is Betty Moller.

See also 
List of communities in Saskatchewan
List of municipalities in Saskatchewan
List of resort villages in Saskatchewan
List of villages in Saskatchewan
List of summer villages in Alberta

References

External links 

Resort villages in Saskatchewan
Excelsior No. 166, Saskatchewan
Division No. 7, Saskatchewan